Tahir Karapınar (born 20 April 1967) is a Turkish football coach and former player who coaches of the Fenerbahçe youth team. He played as a midfielder.

References

1967 births
Living people
Turkish footballers
Footballers from İzmir
Süper Lig players
Association football midfielders
Manisaspor footballers
Göztepe S.K. footballers
Altay S.K. footballers
Turkish football managers
Süper Lig managers
Altay S.K. managers
Fenerbahçe football managers
Gaziantepspor non-playing staff